Pseudocrossocheilus bamaensis is a species of cyprinid fish endemic to China. It is sometimes placed in the genus Sinocrossocheilus.

References

Fish described in 1981
Pseudocrossocheilus